Pederson House and Water Tower is located at the campus of California Lutheran University (CLU) in Thousand Oaks, California, the former home of the Norwegian Colony. It was built by members of the Colony that settled here in 1890. The structure is designated Ventura County Historic Landmark No. 45 and Thousand Oaks Historical Landmark No. 3. It is a typical turn-of-the-century farmhouse constructed in 1913-14 for Lars and Karn Pederson, Norwegian immigrants and members of the Norwegian Colony, who had first settled in Conejo Valley in 1890. The house was erected at the present location of Ahmanson Science Center, but was later relocated  to its current location at the corner of Regent Avenue and Faculty Street. When its original location was determined to become a science building, the university was quoted $125,000 in moving costs, and therefore planned to demolish the house. However, CLU alumni were able to raise the amount in one day and were successful in saving the house.

 of the Pedersons' land were donated by Lars Pederson’s son, Richard Pederson, in order to establish California Lutheran College in 1959. Additional land including the buildings were given to the university in 1967, at which time the buildings were restored.

While currently housing the university’s music department, the ranch house has also been utilized as the university president's home in 1961 and as the dean's office in 1962-63. It had been the private residence of the Pederson family from its 1913 construction until 1960. The water tower was operational until 1960, when plumbing was installed. It was relocated and renovated in 1986.

A bronze statue of Lars Pederson was dedicated on April 18, 2015, next to the flagpoles near the university's Soiland Humanities Center. Nearby Pederson Road is also named for the Pederson family.

Historic designation

Pederson House and Water Tower was designated Ventura County Historic Landmark No. 45 in June 1978, and was designated City of Thousand Oaks Historical Landmark No. 3 in November 1997.

See also
 Ventura County Historic Landmarks & Points of Interest

Sources

History of Thousand Oaks, California
Landmarks in Ventura County, California
History of Ventura County, California
Houses completed in 1923
Houses in Ventura County, California
1923 in California
American Craftsman architecture in California